Gloria Montealegre is a former television reporter and former deputy press secretary for ex-New Jersey Governor Jon S. Corzine. She was a longtime television news reporter for New Jersey Network and was the first female on-air reporter for New York's Channel 47, now Telemundo.

She immigrated to the United States from Colombia in the 1960s. She graduated from Dover High School in 1973.

Montelegre was the host of Images/Imaginas a Latino public affairs show on the former New Jersey Network television station.

References

American television reporters and correspondents
Colombian emigrants to the United States
American press secretaries
People from Dover, New Jersey